Ryuichi Sakamoto. Conversazioni is a book by Massimo Milano. It features interviews between  Milano and Japanese composer Ryuichi Sakamoto, who talks about his peculiar philosophy of life, his multi-directional approach to music, his classical training, new musical trends and the interaction of his work with visual arts. The book also includes three essays on the composer's work, a chronological biography, a discography and a filmography. The foreword is by Japanese writer Banana Yoshimoto.

Ethnomusicology
Biographies about musicians